Maa is a 2022 Indian Punjabi language film directed by Baljit Singh Deo and produced by Ravneet kaur Grewal and Gippy Grewal. The film stars Divya Dutta, Gippy Grewal, Babbal Rai, Raghveer Boli, Rana Ranbir and Gurpreet Ghuggi. The film was released on 6 May 2022.

Synopsis
A lady who has been through many ups and downs throughout her life but she is fearless protector who wishes to provide the best life for her child.

Cast
 Divya Dutta as Manjit Kaur
 Gippy Grewal as Jora
 Babbal Rai as Taqdeer 
 Gupreet Ghuggi
 Ashish Duggal

Soundtrack

Critical response
Maa received positive reviews from critics. The Tribune rated the film 3 out of 5 stars and termed the film a "She is not an iron lady, but a mountain of iron’, as the conspirators in the movie call her,Divya has aced every emotion related to motherhood. Kudos to the dialogue-writer for giving convincing and bold lines,which are apt for a single mother bringing up two children". Sukhpreet Kahlon of "Cinestaan.com" rated the film 3 out of 5 stars and wrote "Maa urges us to take the time to thank our parents and tell them we love them. An important message indeed". Neha Vashist of The Times of India rated the film 4 out of 5 stars and wrote "Apart from the love ballad, every song of the movie was well placed and had the power to move the audience. In a nutshell, if you plan to see this movie, make sure to carry your tissues".

References

External links 
 
 

2022 films
Punjabi-language Indian films
2020s Punjabi-language films